Michael Lee Meyer (born June 2, 1992) is a former American football placekicker. He played college football at Iowa.

College career
Meyer played for the Iowa Hawkeyes from 2010 to 2013. At the University of Iowa, Meyer made 61 field goals in 80 attempts (76.3 percent). Meyer ranks second in team history in career field goals and points.

Professional career

Tennessee Titans
Meyer was signed by the Tennessee Titans as an undrafted free agent on May 11, 2015. He was waived by the team on August 30, 2015.

Atlanta Falcons
On January 10, 2017, Meyer signed a futures contract with the Atlanta Falcons. He was waived on September 1, 2017. He was re-signed to the practice squad on October 11, 2017. He was released on October 17, 2017. He was re-signed to the practice squad on November 8, 2017, but was released six days later.

Jacksonville Jaguars
On November 23, 2017, Meyer was signed to the Jacksonville Jaguars' practice squad, but was released four days later.

References

1992 births
Living people
American football placekickers
Atlanta Falcons players
Iowa Hawkeyes football players
Jacksonville Jaguars players
Tennessee Titans players
Sportspeople from Dubuque, Iowa
Players of American football from Iowa